Disney's LuminAria was a 2001-2002 fireworks show on Paradise Bay at Disney California Adventure at the Disneyland Resort in Anaheim, California. The show was short-lived, lasting only one winter season. The show design was similar to IllumiNations: Reflections of Earth at EPCOT focusing the audience towards Paradise Bay while fountains played in various changing patterns and fireworks were discharged in sync with seasonal music.

The finale showed various holiday cards on projection screens, a fiber optic Christmas tree, and white lights around California Screamin' and the Sun Wheel. Each day, young guests were invited to draw their own holiday cards, which were then scanned and appeared in that evening's presentation.

Show Credits 
The show was conceived and directed by Steve Davison. The music was arranged, adapted, composed and conducted by Don L. Harper, and the main vocals were performed by Miriam Stockley.

See also
 Disney's World of Color

References

Former Walt Disney Parks and Resorts attractions
Walt Disney Parks and Resorts fireworks
Amusement rides introduced in 2001
Amusement rides that closed in 2002
2001 establishments in California
2002 disestablishments in California